Căile Ferate Române (abbreviated as the CFR) is the state railway carrier of Romania. The CIA World Factbook lists Romania with the 23rd largest railway network in the world. The network is significantly interconnected with other European railway networks, providing pan-European passenger and freight services. CFR as an entity has been operating since 1880, even though the first railway on current Romanian territory was opened in 1854. CFR is divided into four autonomous companies:
 CFR Călători, responsible for passenger services;
 CFR Marfă, responsible for freight transport;
 CFR Infrastructură or CFR S.A., manages the infrastructure on the Romanian railway network; and
 Societatea Feroviară de Turism, or SFT, which manages scenic and tourist railways.

CFR is headquartered in Bucharest and has regional divisions centered in Bucharest, Brașov, Cluj-Napoca, Constanța, Craiova, Galați, Iași, and Timișoara. Its International Union of Railways code is 53-CFR.

History

Railways in the nineteenth century
The first railway line on Romania's present-day territory was opened on 20 August 1854 and ran between Oravița in Banat and Baziaș, a port on the Danube. From 12 January 1855, the line was operated by Imperial Royal Privileged Austrian State Railway Company, the Banat province being at that time part of the Austrian Empire. After several improvements in the following months, the line was opened to passenger traffic from 1 November 1856.

Between 1864 and 1880, several railways were constructed in the area of the Kingdom of Romania. On 1 September 1865, the English company John Trevor-Barkley began construction on the Bucharest–Giurgiu line. Commissioned by the King of Romania, the line was opened to traffic on 26 August 1869. The Bucharest-Giurgiu line was the first railway built on Romanian territory at that time (considering that the Oravița-Baziaș line was part of Austria-Hungary, even though it now lies on Romanian territory).

In September 1866, the Romanian Parliament voted for the construction of a  railway, from Vârciorova in the south to Roman in the north, via Ploiești, Bucharest, Buzău, Brăila, Galați, and Tecuci, all important population centres. The price for the construction was at that time 270,000 gold francs per kilometre and was contracted to the German Strousberg consortium. The line was opened in various stages, the first stage (Ploiesti–Bucharest–Galați–Roman) being opened to traffic on 13 September 1872, while the Vârciorova–Ploiești segment was opened some time later, on 9 May 1878. The Vârciorova-Roman line was an important part of Romania's rail infrastructure because it spanned the entire Kingdom and provided an important connection for passengers and freight between several significant Wallachian and Moldavian cities.

On 10 September 1868, Bucharest's Gara de Nord (North Station) was finalised. In January 1880, the Romanian Parliament voted to transfer the ownership of the Vârciorova-Roman line from the private administration of the Strousberg consortium to state ownership, under the administration of CFR. 1880 therefore marks the start of the Căile Ferate Române institution which survives to this date. The first administration of CFR was made up of Ioan Kalinderu, Eugeniu Stătescu, and Ștefan Fălcoianu.

In May 1868, the Romanian state concluded an agreement with another German consortium, known as the "Offenheim Consortium", for the construction of several shorter railways in the region of Moldavia. In 1870, the Iași railway station was inaugurated and the lines were progressively opened from December 1869 to November 1871. Due to the poor management of the lines by the Offenheim Consortium, they were placed under the management of CFR in January 1889.

Meanwhile, during the Romanian War of Independence in 1877, Romania annexed the region of Dobrogea, which had previously belonged to the Ottoman Empire. The Romanian state placed under the management of CFR the Constanța–Cernavodă line, which had been opened during the Ottoman times in 1860. The Bucharest-Giurgiu line, the first line constructed in the Kingdom of Romania, was also placed under the administration of CFR during this time.

Railways in the early twentieth century

In 1918, the historical regions of Transylvania, Banat, Bassarabia, and Bucovina united with the Kingdom of Romania to form Greater Romania. As a result, all railway lines in these regions, previously under the ownership of Austria-Hungary or the Russian Empire, were placed under the administration of CFR. This event was significant for Romanian railways because it meant that the large Arad rolling stock and steel factory, previously located on Austro-Hungarian territory, was now part of Romania, and was consequently used to produce a wide range of rolling stock and locomotives for CFR.

During this time, various railways were "doubled"— that is, double tracks were introduced on routes to permit a greater flow of traffic. The first line to be doubled was the Bucharest–Ploiești–Câmpina line, where doubling was completed in 1912. In the period between the wars, various other lines were doubled, including:

 Constanța–Cernavodă (1931)
 Adjud–Tecuci (1933)
 Teiuș–Apahida (1940)
 Câmpina–Brașov (1941)
 Buzău–Mărășești (1942)

During the 1920s and 1930s CFR also bought several new locomotives and cars, embarking on a plan of widespread modernisation. Diesel traction was introduced, and the Malaxa high-speed DMUs (a modernised version of which are still in use as commuter trains in Banat) were built.

A significant event in the history of the railways was the Grivița Strike of 1933, which occurred during the Great Depression and resulted in violent clashes between railway workers and police.

The Holocaust

During World War II, CFR (Romanian Railways) was involved in the transport of Jewish and Romani people from Bessarabia, Bukovina and Regat to concentration camps  set up in Transnistria. In a notable example, during the Iași pogrom events, Jews were forcibly loaded onto freight cars with planks hammered in place over the windows and traveled for seven (7) days in unimaginable conditions. Many died and were gravely affected by lack of air, blistering heat, lack of water, food or medical attention. These veritable death trains arrived to their destinations, Podu Iloaiei and Călărași, with only one-fifth of their passengers alive. No official apology was released yet by CFR for their role in the Holocaust in Romania.

Railways in Communist Romania

After Romania became a Communist republic in 1947, there was quite a significant amount of investment in railway infrastructure, often to the detriment of other forms of infrastructure. During this period, railways were seen as the symbol of Romania's rapid industrialisation under Communist leaders Gheorghe Gheorghiu-Dej and later by Nicolae Ceaușescu. Aside from an increase in train traffic and the construction of various new lines, especially in rural areas, the bulk of electrification and line doubling occurred during the Communist period. Also, the railways in Southern Dobruja were left to Bulgaria in 1940 and the ones in Northern Bucovina and Bessarabia were ceded to the Soviet Union in 1947.

Electrification and track doubling

The first line to be electrified on the Romanian railway network was the Bucharest–Brașov line, which was used by a significant amount of passenger and freight traffic. Works on electrification started on 27 December 1960, and the first electrified segment, from Brașov to Predeal, opened on 9 December 1965. By 20 April 1966, a further segment was electrified, from Predeal to Câmpina.

Various lines were also supplemented with double tracks to permit a wider flow of traffic, including:

 Făurei–Galați (1971)
 Pantelimon–Cernavodă (1971)
 Bucharest–Roșiori–Craiova (1972)
 Chitila–Golești (1972)
 Brașov–Câmpul Libertății (1974)
 Adjud–Suceava (1975)
 Dragalina–Călărași (1970s)

By the mid-1970s, steam traction disappeared completely out of mainstream use, being replaced by standardised diesel and electric locomotives and cars, most of which were built in Romania, at the Electroputere factory in Craiova, respectively Întreprinderea de Vagoane Arad (IVA) factory in Arad.

CFR after 1989

After the Romanian Revolution of 1989, which resulted in the fall of Communism, Romania was left with one of the largest, most dense and most frequently used railway networks in Europe; but at the same time having relatively outdated infrastructure. This, combined with the economic decline that Romania faced in the 1990s due to its transition to a market economy, resulted in CFR entering a period of relative decline. Several little-used routes, especially in rural areas, were cut back, and rolling stock, most of which was acquired in the 1970s, entered a period of disrepair. CFR's image, both domestically and abroad, suffered greatly, due to reports of dilapidated trains, poor service and general disarray of management.

This situation continued until the year 1998, when Societatea Națională a Căilor Ferate Române (The National Society of Romanian Railways) was split into five independently administered companies : Compania Națională de Căi Ferate "CFR" SA (National Railway Company "CFR" – dealing with infrastructure), CFR Călători (CFR Passenger Services – the operator of passenger trains), CFR Marfă (Freight transport company), CFR Gevaro (Services linked with restaurant cars) and SAAF (dealing with excess rolling stock to be sold, leased or scrapped). After this, the situation of Romanian railways improved significantly, mainly spurred on by Romania's economic boom after the year 2000, which permitted a considerable amount of government investment in railways and has led CFR to once again become one of the most successful railway operators in the region.

Since 1989, a number of small branch lines have been closed— especially those designated for industrial purposes or having a narrow gauge. This has been generally done due to greater competition from private bus services as well as generally low passenger numbers on those lines. The narrow gauge line from Turda to Abrud, for example, could not hope to compete with the private car or bus, the journey time being just short of six and a half hours for the  trip (CFR Timetable 1988, table 309). As of 2022 the Turda–Abrud journey by bus takes 2 hours and 45 minutes.

Some other line closures were thought imminent especially on the branch lines in Timiș County, which were generally very old, little-used and heavily damaged by the 2005 floods in that area; but most seem to have been reprieved and now are operated by private operators. Between  of railway lines have been divested of CFR control and a few have closed completely since 1990, most of which were in rural areas. Overall however, actual railway closures in Romania have been much less drastic than in other former Communist bloc countries, such as Hungary or Eastern Germany; indeed the "closure" figures given include lines which have been taken over by private operators and continue to operate (2010). Some standard gauge lines have in fact reopened since closure in the 1990s and some narrow-gauge tracks have recently been reopened by SFT (CFR's Railway Tourism Society) for tourism, but are only run occasionally, about twice a month (lines include Abrud-Câmpeni, Târgu Mureș-Band or Moldovița-Vama). All forestry railroads (căi ferate forestiere in Romanian) still in operation after 1989 have been privatized and sold to the forestry companies. Some, such as the Vasser Valley Scenic Railroad, have since become significant tourist attractions.

In the year 2000 some 47,560 people were employed by CFR. By July 2010 this had reduced to 25,382 (see report below) in part due to the divesting of certain operations to other (private) companies. Other economies continue and are envisaged and are set out in the report Strategia de restructurare a domeniului feroviar August 2010 published by the Romanian ministry of transport (August 2010).

Modernisation

In the early 2000s, CFR embarked on a comprehensive modernization programme in order to improve its image, which was, both internationally and domestically, plagued by reports of poor service and outdated rolling stock. The first phases of the modernization included a refurbishment of a large number of Rapid and InterCity rolling stock, as well as a general expansion of IC services to form a Romania-wide express network.

To strengthen the growth of the Romanian train network, CFR acquired in early 2003 several new Siemens Desiro trainsets, some of which were assembled in Arad. Nicknamed "Săgeata Albastră" (Blue Arrow), they are currently used on both Regio and InterRegio services for short and medium distances. The Desiro trainsets were used as the icons of CFR's modernisation, despite criticism that CFR should not have used the Desiro trainsets, which are diesel multiple units, on mainline express services, as they are designed mainly for short-distance commuter rail, as seen by their fairly hard seating, low speed, and poor noise insulation. CFR responded to this by introducing, in late 2004, a number of new Desiro trainsets that had better sound insulation and 70 seats, instead of 110 seats, thereby increasing the width and pitch of the seats. To this date, CFR continues to use Desiro trains on medium-distance routes, even though it has replaced them on several long-distance routes by other refurbished rolling stock.

Aside from the Desiro, CFR has also bought in the past few years 80 new sleeping cars (WLABmee type), couchettes, InterCity cars, as well as double-decker cars to use InterRegio trains of a high volume of passengers. The new CFR sleepers are some of the most modern in Europe, having air-conditioning, LCD screens and modern showers in each compartment.

Apart from improvements in rolling stock, CFR has also bought or modernised several locomotive classes, including the widespread Class 40 and Class 41 electric locomotives.

Part of the CFR modernisation programme is the XSELL system, which seeks to establish a Romania-wide electronic ticketing system. The XSELL system was launched at Bucharest North station in November 2004, and is now in use in almost all major railway stations in Romania.

In 2003, Romanian mobile phone operator Connex GSM Romania, now Vodafone, struck a deal with CFR to provide quick mobile services to the CFR timetable and booking system. A 24-hour hotline operates where customers of Connex can call a certain three-digit number (652) and get real-time information on train routes, timetables, station platform departures, delays, prices and ticketing information and booking of trains from Bucharest North station. Orange Romania has signed a similar agreement in early 2004.

Smoking is banned on all CFR trains as of 1 September 2006.

CFR services continue to improve, with the company reaching a turning point in its business strategy and services being some of the best in the region. However, some people have raised concerns that CFR, which has not reached profitability yet, does not have the means to finance ongoing infrastructural modernization, especially in the context of a government that is, at present, keener to develop road infrastructure at the expense of railways.

CFR initiated a major infrastructure project in April 2006 – the modernization of the Bucharest–Constanța railway line, in order to improve the maximum speed attainable on the line (from 140 km/h now to 200 km/h in 2008) and increase the capacity of the line. Completion date was estimated to be mid-2008.

Partial privatisation
Although passenger railway services are not a state monopoly in Romania, CFR remains the only passenger carrier operating at a national level. However, after the reorganization of CFR in 2011, around 15% of Romanian railway tracks have been leased to private companies. These are known as non-interoperable tracks (linii neinteroperabile in Romanian). The main operators are: S.C. Regional S.R.L., S.C. Transferoviar Grup S.A., S.C. Regio Călători S.R.L., and S.C. Servtransinvest S.A., which now operate a significant number (especially Regio Călători) of routes .  Early transfers to these companies included Zărnești–Brașov, Brașov–Întorsura Buzăului, Sfântu Gheorghe–Brețcu, Sighișoara–Odorheiu Secuiesc, Șibot–Cugir, Blaj–Praid, Galați–Bârlad, Buzău–Nehoiașu, Iași–Dorohoi, Timișoara Nord–Nerău, Satu Mare–Bixad, Arad–Nădlac, Bistrița Bârgăului–Bistrița Nord–Luduș, Arad–Brad, Roșiori Nord–Piatra Olt and many others lines. On these lines, CFR is not allowed to operate its trains—companies which have leased the tracks have a virtual monopoly on their usage. Aside from CFR Călători, 12 other companies provide local passenger services, on non-interoperable tracks, even though none of these services exceed  in line length. 28 private companies, including Petromidia and Servtrans, operate freight transport services on main lines with their own rolling stock, leasing usage rights from CFR.

Future changes
September 2014 saw the publication of the government report: Master Plan General de Transport al României.

On the face of it the lengthy report envisages reduction of passenger services on 25% to 40% of the lines. The 'small print' reveals however that closures will not happen overnight or even over the next few years (there is no closure schedule in the report); and closures will only occur if private operators or local authority/perhaps EU financial support cannot be obtained. In addition the report has costed major improvements to the long-distance network considerably to reduce journey times. These projects include recommencing work on the abandoned construction (90% completed in the 1990s) of the 39 km link line from Râmnicu Vâlcea to Vâlcele which will reduce the journey from Bucharest to Sibiu by some 78 km and journey times by at least 90 minutes.

Passenger services

CFR Călători, the passenger service division of CFR, operates seven types of passenger train, both on Romania's territory, with rolling stock and locomotives, or internationally, with rolling stock. Also, CFR operates international trains on Romanian territory with its own locomotives. The train types vary in terms of speed and type of rolling stock.

In 2015, approximately 55 million passenger journeys were made with the company. In the same time 12 million further journeys were made using the private operators.

The CFR train types are:
 Regio (R) – the trains have assigned numbers from 2000 to 9999.
 InterRegio (IR) – the trains have assigned numbers from 200 to 499, 600 to 999, 1000 to 1999 and 10000 to 16999.
 InterCity (IC) – numbered from 500 to 599, discontinued in December 2014.

Regio trains

Regio trains (regional), formerly Local (Romanian: "Personal") trains (until December 2011), also termed commuter trains (navete or trenuri de navetiști), are the most abundant type of trains on the CFR passenger network. They are used for two main purposes, as shuttle, or commuter, trains, linking towns with neighbouring villages, and linking neighbouring cities with each other.

Local trains (now Regio), have the lowest average speed (34.3 km/h in 2004) and the least comfortable (usually oldest) rolling stock, and have a reputation for being very slow, crowded and generally unkempt which is only gradually changing. Regio trains operate mostly on local routes and stop at every station. Train fares for this type are the cheapest, since no supplement is paid, only the base fare, based on distance. Seats are not reservable. The rolling stock on Regio trains differs widely. On routes that link neighbouring cities with each other (such as Bucharest and Pitești), the quality of the rolling stock is much better than those services which provide a shuttle link between cities and rural areas (such as the Timișoara-Berzovia line).

Most Regio rolling stock consist of compartment single level and open-plan double-decker cars. As of 2007, most Regio trains, especially on rural routes, have only 2nd class cars. The livery of most Regio cars is painted in the color scheme of CFR Calatori (blue and grey), with the rolling stock built in the 1970s and 1980s. Some very short rural routes in Romania's Bukovina region use rolling stock from the 1940s and 1950s, refitted with bus seats and operating like railbuses. CFR is refurbishing a range of double-decker Local (Regio) cars, that will be used on Local and Accelerat trains. The refurbished cars, painted in the same livery as the old ones, have been introduced since 2003, and are cleaner, although they still use most of the old fittings. Exceptions to this widespread use of older rolling stock for Local trains is found on some routes (such as Sibiu–Craiova) that are operated using Desiro trainsets, and some others are operated using modernized electric trainsets.

The new private operators also use the term Regio using mainly (refurbished) railbuses.

InterRegio trains
InterRegional trains (IR), formerly Accelerat and Rapid trains (until December 2011), are used for medium and long-distance services that stop only in towns or cities. InterRegional trains have higher speeds. They are also more expensive, requiring the payment of a supplement alongside the base fee. Some services of the InterRegional type require a reservation. InterRegional trains are also used for cross-regional long-distance routes (for example, Timișoara to Bucharest). Despite the long distances, InterRegional trains tend to stop in every town (even though they bypass villages) and hence are very popular, though they are seldom used for express travel between two large cities.

Since 2009, the InterRegio 1821/1822 from Arad to Constanța via Deva, Tîrgu Jiu, Craiova and Bucharest also travels to Constanța with an extra sleeperette car and sleeper car. The InterRegio rolling stock is formed of both single-decker cars painted in the painting scheme of CFR Calatori (blue and gray). Single-decker cars are all corridor-type, with the old cars having 8 seats per compartment in second class and 6 in first class whereas the new cars have 6 seats per compartment regardless of class (this type of coaches are used now for Regio Trains and rarely on InterRegio Trains). Double-decker cars have 4 seats per row in an open plan.

In early 2005, CFR introduced a new double-decker car for medium-distance, highly used Interregional routes such as Bucharest–Predeal. Siemens Desiro trainsets have also been introduced on medium-distance InterRegional routes in Transylvania and Moldavia (Iași–Vatra Dornei). Longer-distance InterRegional trains often have couchettes, and sleepers started to be added again to consists after a lengthy absence. Dining cars are never used on these trains. In the 2010 schedule, many short and medium distance routes (such as Bucharest–Craiova, Bucharest–Râmnicu Vâlcea–Sibiu, Bucharest–Tulcea, Craiova–Sibiu, Timișoara–Sibiu, Cluj-Napoca–Timișoara) were served by modernized double-decker cars or Desiro trainsets. Some long-distance trains (Bucharest–Timișoara, Bucharest–Târgu Jiu–Arad, Bucharest–Cluj-Napoca–Satu Mare, Bucharest–Iași, Bucharest–Vatra Dornei, Iași–Timișoara, Sighetu Marmației–Bucharest) also use modernized Rapid-style cars.

Rolling stock on InterRegional trains has recently been the object of CFR's modernisation plan. Various series of cars have been refurbished, and fitted with air-conditioning, ecological toilets, etc. However, a small and rapidly declining number of Rapid rolling stock, mainly on lesser-used routes, remains fairly aged and outdated. As of 2004, Siemens Desiro DMUs have been introduced on medium-distance Rapid routes. Most Rapid rolling stocks are painted in the painting scheme of CFR Călători (blue and gray). All cars are uncompartmented and are usually air-conditioned. Sleepers, couchettes and dining-cars are available on most long routes.

From Sighetu Marmației the Rapid train needs over 21 hours to complete the  trip.
From Satu Mare nearly 22 hours to complete the  trip.
From Oradea over 19 hours to complete the  trip
From Timișoara Nord over 15 hours to complete the  trip.

In the case of travelling such a long distance as mentioned above, it is recommended to book a sleeperette (the passenger can choose between 4–6 passengers in a compartment). The 6 passenger-compartment is the cheapest option for a higher comfort. Fares and timetables can be checked on www.cfrcalatori.ro.

InterCity (discontinued)
InterCity (IC) was CFR's premier train type and was used for daytime express services between major cities, as well as shuttle services between Bucharest and the Black Sea coast and the Carpathian mountain resorts. InterCity trains typically only stopped in large cities (generally of over 100,000 inhabitants). Due to this, InterCity prices included a significant supplement alongside the base fee.

The InterCity rolling stock was either new or refurbished (all IC rolling stock was built after 1995), with air-conditioning, power-plugs (in both 1st and 2nd class carriages) and plush bucket armchairs, as well as complimentary newspapers, free meals and airplane-like service in first class. These trains generally had a reputation for their high levels of comfort, cleanliness and service. The InterCity standard livery was usually grey and blue, especially in the case of the C160-class rolling stock, which is the newest type. Most InterCity rolling stock was open plan (no compartments). When CFR bought the Desiro DMUs, they were mostly used for InterCity trains, but due to complaints related to their comfort levels, they were replaced with standard cars for most routes and now the DESIRO DMUs are used for the Regio trains.

In fact, according to Friends of CFR, a Romanian railway journal, there was a considerable downgrading in quality when the Bucharest–Vienna IC service switched from being operated by CFR to being run by Austrian Railways (ÖBB) in 2003, leading to numerous complaints that the route should revert to CFR cars instead of Austrian ÖBB cars.

Beginning with December 2006, the company introduced the business service on certain IC routes (București Nord–Timișoara Nord, București Nord–Oradea). These wagons were refurbished by CFR Grivița and they provided two classes: standard and standard exclusive. According to class, these rail cars provide leather or fabric-covered armchairs, monitors, individual displays for every seat, 4 channel audio system with earphones, wireless internet access, bar, air conditioning, and they were equipped with an elevator for disabled travellers. As of 1 June 2014, InterCity trains used to operate on the following routes:

Before early 2003, there was also a train type known as InterCityExpress (ICE), which ran from Bucharest to Constanța, but these have been discontinued and transformed into IC and later into IR, while maintaining the same rolling stock.

Because of the bad infrastructure as of 2015 InterCity trains are not in use anymore because the fare was too high. There are some trains which are running like InterCity but with InterRegio cost. Now the rolling stock used before 2015 for Intercity trains is used now for the InterRegio trains.

Speeds
Average operating speeds (including all stops in stations) according to CFR, are in 2018:

 39 km/h for Regio trains
 55 km/h for InterRegio trains

The longest train route, as of 2005, is the one between Iași, in the north-east, and Timișoara, in the west, which takes 18 hours with an Interregio train to complete. For example, the journey between Suceava Burdujeni and Bucharest is 447 km, and takes approximately 5-6 hours to complete at an average speed of 80 km/h.

Freight services

Freight services in Romania are operated mostly by CFR Marfă, the freight division of CFR, as well as by 28 other private companies who operate on lines leased from CFR Infrastructură. The CFR Marfă fleet is made up of 987 locomotives, most of which were built in Romania or the former Yugoslavia. The fact that rail freight remains maintains a strong market share in Romania, as well as a number of efficiency reforms, has led CFR Marfă to perform quite well financially in recent years, even though it remains loss-making. In 2003, the CFR Marfă's net loss was 8.8 million new lei (approximately US$3 million), reduced from 141.5 million new lei in 2002.

Freight trains follow the same speed limits to those issued for passenger trains, although hazardous materials, explosive, nuclear, flammable, chemical or otherwise dangerous trains have a special regime. Most locomotives have a physical speed limit of 160 or 120 km/h, but freight trains are not usually running at speeds exceeding 100 km/h.

Main lines

Locomotives and stock

CFR Călători (passenger services) and CFR Marfă (freight services) use a range of electric (known as LE), diesel electric (LDE), diesel hydraulic (LDH) and diesel mechanical (LDM/LDMM) locomotives. SFT (tourist railways division) uses steam locomotives (both narrow gauge and standard gauge) and diesel mechanical locomotives.

Each of the four CFR divisions have their own locomotives, and these are generally not interchanged. For example, a CFR Marfǎ locomotive should not be used to pull a CFR Cǎlǎtori train. In practice however, this rule does not hold, and frequently the companies use other rolling stock through informal lease agreements. Moreover, private companies' rolling stock is used at times, usually because of emergencies (such as a locomotive breaking down and requiring a replacement to keep the line open, and an unused private locomotive being closer).

Electric locomotives
Most of the electric locomotives employed by CFR were built by Electroputere Craiova (known as EA-type) and Rade Končar Zagreb (known as EC-type). All trains have electric heating. CFR owns 1,066 electric locomotives, 933 of which were built by Electroputere (Class 40, 41, 42) and 133 built by Končar (Class 43, 44, 46).

Diesel locomotives
CFR's diesel locomotives have been built by Electroputere Craiova (classes 60 to 68) and FAUR Bucharest (classes 69 to 95).

Classes 60 and 62 have as prime mover a twin-bank cylinder Sulzer 12LDA28 diesel engine rated at 2100 hp@750rpm, being derated from its nominal power by a smaller turbocharger and a lower max rpm. The difference between classes 60 and 62 is that the class 62 features traction motors certified and capable of pulling passenger coaches at 120 km/h instead of the 100 km/h allowed for class 60.

Classes 63 and 65 are modified by replacing Sulzer engines with 2 stroke 8 cylinders EMD 8-710G which develop 2150 hp at crankshaft at 900 rpm, the generators were replaced with alternators and DC traction motors were replaced with new ones. Class 63 has a max speed of 120 km/h while class 65 is limited to 100 km/h. 63 and 65 are in service for CFR Călători only for passenger coaches' traction. 63 and 65 do not feature Dynamic Braking Systems available in North America.

The following classes are in service:

Diesel multiple units
CFR Călători uses diesel multiple units (DMUs) mainly for passenger services on shorter and little-used lines, even though the Siemens Desiro DMUs have also been used for InterRegio and InterCity services on longer distances.

Electric multiple units
A 6-car regional EMU built by Electroputere was used from 1975 to 1997, although they were rare, only 8 being made. By June 2006, there were no electric multiple units (EMUs) in service. However, CFR bought some second-hand Z-6100 and Z-6300 EMUs from SNCF, and their CFL version 250 with 2 cars and 260 with 3 cars, which were modernised by Remarul 16 Februarie in Cluj-Napoca and were used for commuter trains, as class 58, until 2020 when they were withdrawn. The last one to be used was 58-1007-2 (Z-6316).

Rail links with adjacent countries
Romania is linked by rail with all neighboring countries.
 Same gauge:
  Bulgaria 
  Hungary 
  Serbia 
 Break-of-gauge /:
  Ukraine 
  Moldova

Notable people
 

George Cosmovici (1857–1920), mechanical engineer and inventor

See also

 Bucharest North railway station
 CFR Cluj football club
 Grup Feroviar Roman
 Rail transport by country
 Rail transport in Romania
 Regiotrans
 Reșița Steam Locomotive Museum
 Transportation in Romania

Notes

References

External links

 Official site of the Căile Ferate Române
 Train Timetable for the state railway operator (C.F.R. Călători)
 Train Timetable for the private railway operators
 All about rail transport from Romania
 Romanian Railways picture gallery at railfaneurope.net
 CFR Freight (in English)
 Railnet.ro – Romanian Trainspotter's Forum
 Photo Gallery of Romanian locomotives (in English)
 For Eurail and Romanian Rail Passes
 Photos of Romanian trains in scenic landscape
 Forum about CFR and other Romanian railway-related topics
 Photo gallery of Romanian rolling stock, infrastructure and stations

 
Railway companies of Romania
Passenger rail transport in Romania
Romanian brands
Government-owned companies of Romania
Companies based in Bucharest